Education in Antigua and Barbuda is compulsory and free for children between the ages of 5 and 16 years.  The system of education in Antigua and Barbuda is based on the British educational system. The school year begins in September and ends in June of the following year. In order to ensure that all costs related to schooling are covered by the government, there is an education levy on all basic wages in Antigua and Barbuda, with the funds used toward such costs as supplies, transportation, and school infrastructure maintenance.  

In 1972, the technical and teacher’s training colleges merged and formed the Antigua State College. Additional training options outside of university are offered at the Antigua and Barbuda Institute of Information Technology (ABIIT) and the Antigua and Barbuda Hospitality Training Institute (ABHTI).

In 2019, the University of the West Indies opened its fifth campus overall (and fourth physical campus) in Five Islands. The country was previously served solely by the University of the West Indies Open Campus. The government of Antigua and Barbuda contributes financially to the UWI.

The island of Antigua currently has three foreign-owned for-profit offshore medical schools. The island's medical schools cater mostly to foreign students but contribute to the local economy and health care. The three schools are:
 The American University of Antigua (AUA), founded in 2004
 The University of Health Sciences Antigua (UHSA), founded in 1982
 The Metropolitan University College of Medicine.

Those interested in higher education also enrol at schools in the United States, Europe and Canada.  The adult literacy rate is approximately 99%.

See also
List of schools in Antigua and Barbuda
List of universities in Antigua and Barbuda

References

Antigua and Barbuda, Commonwealth of Learning Network Statistics